Kollura Sri Mookambika  is a 1993 Indian Kannada-language Hindu mythological film, directed and produced by Renuka Sharma. Chi. Udaya Shankar has written the story and screenplay and Pughalendi Mahadevan has scored the music. The film stars Sridhar, Bhavya and Vajramuni. The film is centered on the Goddess Mookambika.

The film won State Film Awards in Art direction category.

Cast
 Vajramuni as Kamhasura alias Mookasura
 Bhavya as Chandraprabha, Wife of Kamhasura
 Sridhar as Lord Shiva
 Ramakrishna as Narada
 Srijyothi as Goddess Mookambika / Lakshmi / Parvathi / Dakshayini
 Anand as Lord Vishnu
 Vijay Kashi as Lord Brahma
 Umashree as Goddess Saraswati
 Mukhyamantri Chandru as Sudharma Maharaja of Vidharba
 Srinivasa Murthy as Asura Guru Shukracharya
 Doddanna as Daksha
 Thoogudeepa Srinivas as Kamhasura Father
 Master Anand as Child Kamhasura
 Vijay Raghavendra as Shankaracharya
 Nagesh Babu as Veerabhadra
 Shivakumar as Indra
 Vijaykashi as Lord Brahma
 Sadashiva Brahmavar as Kola Maharishi
 Shivaprakash as Mantri
 Sihi Kahi Chandru as Devashilpi Mayasura

Soundtrack

References

1993 films
1990s Kannada-language films
Indian drama films
Films directed by Renuka Sharma